Dmitriyevsky is a rural locality (a khutor) in Ostryanskoye Rural Settlement, Nizhnedevitsky District, Voronezh Oblast, Russia. The population was 297 as of 2010. There are 4 streets.

Geography 
Dmitriyevsky is located 38 km south of Nizhnedevitsk (the district's administrative centre) by road. Ostryanka is the nearest rural locality.

References 

Rural localities in Nizhnedevitsky District